Ignacio Andrés Caroca Cordero (born November 2, 1993) is a Chilean footballer who currently plays for Rangers of the Primera B de Chile.

Personal life
He has two brothers who are professional footballers: his older brother Rafael – who has been international with Chile at senior level – and his younger brother Matías.

References

External links
 
 

1993 births
Living people
People from Curicó
Chilean footballers
Chile under-20 international footballers
Colo-Colo footballers
A.C. Barnechea footballers
Colo-Colo B footballers
Ñublense footballers
Curicó Unido footballers
Deportes Iquique footballers
Puerto Montt footballers
Deportes Colchagua footballers
Rangers de Talca footballers
Primera B de Chile players
Chilean Primera División players
Segunda División Profesional de Chile players
Association football midfielders